Leptostylus saxuosus is a species of beetle in the family Cerambycidae. It was described by Tippman in 1960.

References

Leptostylus
Beetles described in 1960